"Zuginsfeld" is an expressionist, satirical poem by Otto Nebel. The poem covers over 6,000 verses and is divided into twenty-three sections. The content is divided into two parts. The first part covers the structure of the military and the second part discusses the Thirty Years' War. The poem is a condemnation of war and the society that produces it.

Creation
Nebel wrote the first two versions of "Zuginsfeld" in 1918 during his fourteen-month stay as a prisoner-of-war at the English prison camp Colsterdale (Yorkshire) during World War I. It was published in installments by the magazine Der Sturm between 1920 and 1923.

Contents
The main theme of "Zuginsfeld" is the horror of war and the subsequent arousal of intellectual and artistic appeal. Special loathing attests to language, which has become a lie.

"Zuginsfeld" is divided into two main parts and 23 sections. Part one starts with the structure of the military. The sections are titled as follows:

"The Congregation" (Section I)
"The Corporal" (Section II)
"The Sergeant" (Section III)
"Chamber Sergeant" (Section IV)
"Writer" (Section V)
"Military Music" (Section VI)
"Army Doctor" (Section VII)
"Lieutenant" (Section VIII)
"Captain" (Section IX)
"Colonel" (Section XI)
"General" (Section XII)
"Exercises" (Section XIII)
"Alp" (Section XIV)
"Kaiser Wilhelm" (Section XV)

Part two begins with "The War Breaks Out" (Section XVI), and continues with the theme of the war until "Help!" (Section XXIII), a cry without an answer that ends the work. The poem spans the length of the Thirty Years' War, from the pre-war days to just after the war's end.

Allusions
The title of the work, "Zuginsfeld", is an allusion to Springinsfeld, the antihero from Grimmelshausen's work Der seltsame Springinsfeld.

Language and style
In "Zuginsfeld", phrases and comments are displayed side by side. The  poem is characterized by strings of words that are interrupted abruptly in some places. "Zuginsfeld" begins by quoting a patriotic phrase: "Military strength in the Spirit". Immediately Nebel asks the critical question: who will vouch for that? The answer is "the Man". According to the interpretation of René Radrizzani, in the next lines the man is manipulated as a subject and uniformed. "Zuginsfeld" also contains puns, such as "Conscription: vulgarity in space!", "Kaffir gossip - coffee battle", "thief homeland retired", and "right to vote". According to Radrizzani, the language holds the world language of the poem as whole, exposing the fog phrases and company's lies.

In other media
In 1970, a radio play was produced, with Nebel's participation. 
In 1972, a recording of a reading was recorded by Nebel in Basel.

Sources
Zuginsfeld: Graphic Images of Otto Nebel (1930). The Swiss Federal Archives Berne; Lit Bhattacharya-Stettler, Therese Otto Nebel. Benteli, Bern 1982,  .
Rene Radrizzani (ed.): Otto Nebel, The Poetic Work: Zuginsfeld, Unfeig, The Wheel of the Titans <vol. 1-3>. Edition Text + Kritik, Munich, 1979,

References

20th-century German literature
War poetry
Expressionist works
German poetry